Richard Deane was Bishop of Ossory  from 1610 until his death in 1613.

Deane was educated at Merton College, Oxford and held the office of Dean of Ossory from 1603 until 1610. He died on 20 February 1613.

Notes

1576 deaths
16th-century Anglican bishops in Ireland
Anglican bishops of Ossory
Clergy from Yorkshire